Frank D. Peters (born July 17, 1947) is a former American football tackle who played one season for the Cincinnati Bengals of the American Football League (AFL). He played college football at Ohio.

Early life and education
Frank Peters was born on July 17, 1947, in Lockbourne, Ohio. He attended Hamilton Township High School in Columbus, before playing college football at Ohio. He spent 1965 to 1968 at Ohio University, lettering from '66 to '68. Following his senior season, where he was co-captain of the team, Peters was named the school's "student-athlete of the year".

Professional career
After his college career Peters was selected with the 233rd pick of the 1969 NFL/AFL Draft by the New York Jets. He was released at roster cuts and subsequently signed off waivers by the Cincinnati Bengals. With the Bengals he appeared in three games. Peters was released the next season, ending his professional career.

References

1947 births
Living people
Players of American football from Columbus, Ohio
American football centers
American football tackles
Ohio Bobcats football players
New York Jets players
Cincinnati Bengals players